Pieter Janssens Elinga (1623–1682) was a Dutch Golden Age painter, mainly of domestic interior scenes with a strong emphasis on the rectangular geometrical elements of windows, floor tiling paintings, and other elements, and a few genre figures.  He also painted still lifes.

Biography
He was born in Bruges as the son of Gisbrecht Janssens, who probably taught him to paint. When he moved to Rotterdam in 1653, he changed his name to Elinga. He moved to Amsterdam in 1657, where he probably died. He is last registered alive in 1657, when he paid a poll tax in Amsterdam. His widow is registered there in a notarized document as a widow in 1682. Elinga was a follower of Pieter de Hooch and Willem Kalf.

Legacy
He is best known today for his perspective box, one of only 6 known to be still intact. It is on show at the Bredius Museum in The Hague. Perspective boxes were experiments with light, architectural elements, and the camera obscura. Samuel van Hoogstraten also made one, which is on show at the National Gallery.

Given the size and contorted perspective, the small painting View of Delft by Carel Fabritius has been considered to have originally been part of a perspective box.

References

External links
Dutch and Flemish paintings from the Hermitage, an exhibition catalog from The Metropolitan Museum of Art (fully available online as PDF), which contains material on Elinga (cat. no. 15)

1623 births
1682 deaths
Dutch Golden Age painters
Dutch male painters
Artists from Bruges
Dutch still life painters